The Viri Galilaei Church is a Greek Orthodox church located at the northern peak of the Mount of Olives in East Jerusalem. It is part of the Monastery of Little Galilee on the Mount of Olives, which belongs to the Greek Orthodox Patriarchate of Jerusalem, and serves as the private residence of the Patriarch.

Its name is in Latin and means "Men of Galilee". This same Jesus, who has been taken from you into heaven, will come back in the same way you have seen him go into heaven." The association of this particular site with the biblical episode is based on a medieval tradition, labelled by Thomas Cook as "worthless".

It is in this place that the historic meeting between Pope Paul VI, head of the Catholic Church and the Patriarch of Constantinople Athenagoras, Ecumenical Patriarch of the Eastern Orthodox Church, was held in 1964, marking an important step in the ecumenical reconciliation attempt between the two denominations.

Location
The church is at the northern summit of the Mount of Olives (810 meters), not far from the southern peak where the Russian Orthodox Church of the Ascension and the nearby Chapel of the Ascension are located, and a little southwest of the German Lutheran church of the same name, which is part of the Augusta Victoria compound.

Description
To the right and to the left of the door are two pillars on which the inscription in Greek can be read (ΟΙ ΕΝΔΕΜΑΘΗΤΑΙ ΜΑΘΗΤΑΙ ΕΥΘΗΕΑΝΣΑΝ ΕΙΣ ΓΑΛΙΛΑΙΑΝ ΓΑΛΙΛΑΙΑΝ), from : "the eleven disciples return to Galilee".

Current status
After the 1967 Six-Day War and the Israeli occupation of East Jerusalem, this church has remain intact. Israel's 1980 unilateral annexation of East Jerusalem was condemned as a violation of international law and was declared null and void by the United Nations Security Council in UNSC Resolution 478.

See also
Christianity in Israel

References

Greek Orthodox churches in Israel
Eastern Orthodox church buildings in Jerusalem
Eastern Orthodox church buildings in the State of Palestine
Mount of Olives